Douglas E. Berger is an American attorney, former prosecutor and politician who served as a member of the North Carolina General Assembly representing the state's 7th Senate district for four terms, starting in 2005. A member of the Democratic Party, his district included Franklin County, Granville County, Vance County and Warren County.

Biography

Berger is the former senator for district 18.  He was born in Miami, Florida and raised in Smithfield, North Carolina where his father Jack Berger owned and operated a metal fabrication shop "Ace Welding" from 1966 to 1996. In 1978, he graduated from Smithfield Selma High School where he served as the president of his high school political science club and editorial editor of his high school newspaper. From 1978 to 1982, he attended and graduated from the University of North Carolina at Chapel Hill, where he earned Bachelor of Arts Degrees in Political Science and Speech Communications.  During his college years he became involved in a wide range of political  activities.  He worked as a volunteer in the John B. Anderson campaign for president in 1980.  Following the 1980 campaign, he initiated the first college chapter of "Americans for Common Sense", a political group led nationally by former presidential candidate George McGovern. Upon graduation, he was employed by Ralph Nader's organization, PIRG. In October 1982, he initiated the South Africa divestment movement at UNC when he produced a report showing how UNC was investing in companies operating in South Africa. Also in 1982, he organized students to support and participate in the effort to stop the dumping of PCBs in Warren County. From 1983 to 1985, he attended the UNC School of Law.  In 1983, he organized a campus political party that won 13 out of 27 seats on the student government legislative council. He was elected as a campus representative to serve the UNC School of Law.  In 1985, he ran for student body president coming in first out of a field of 9 candidates only to lose in a runoff. From 1985 to 1988, he served as a public school teacher in Kinston, North Carolina, where he taught North Carolina History, United States History and World History.  In 1989, he returned to law school and graduated from the University of North Carolina at Chapel Hill School of Law.  In 1990, he started his legal career as an Assistant District Attorney for the 11th Judicial District, successfully prosecuting cases ranging from DWI, burglary, sexual assault to murder cases. He then moved to the 9th Judicial District where he served as an Assistant District Attorney from 1991 to 1994. He prosecuted cases in Warren, Franklin, Granville & Vance Counties.  From 1994 through 2004, he served in a judicial capacity as a Deputy Commissioner at the North Carolina Industrial Commission, where he rendered over 500 decisions.

Electoral experience

Berger was first elected in North Carolina's seventh Senate District in 2004. He ran for the Senate after a losing bid for the state's Commissioner of Labor in 2000.

Commissioner of Labor race

During his race for North Carolina Commissioner of Labor, North Carolina Democratic Party leaders questioned Berger's past involvement with the Democratic Socialists of America. A private internal memo between two party leaders became public during the N.C. Board of Elections investigation of former N.C. Governor Mike Easley. The memo's author states, "We need to decide whether it's worth attempting to find a replacement for Berger now. If not, then we need to work on a damn good response to the attack."

Berger's involvement with the socialist group became an issue in the general election campaign being cited in several news reports. The Associated Press and Triangle Business Journal wrote about his socialist past during the 2000 election. The Carolina Journal brought it up again during Berger's first race for state senate.

N.C. Senate races

Berger defeated Republican Harold Frazier in 2004 with 57% percent of the vote. The election box below shows the results of his subsequent elections.

Professional experience

Berger joined the Law Offices of James Scott Farrin in 2005 where he handles Workers’ Compensation litigation and dispute resolution.

Berger is a member of the North Carolina State Bar, the North Carolina Bar Association, the State Employees Association of North Carolina and the North Carolina Advocates for Justice.

References

External links
Doug Berger for North Carolina Senate official campaign website
 Attorney Doug Berger profile

Democratic Party North Carolina state senators
North Carolina lawyers
University of North Carolina at Chapel Hill alumni
People from Smithfield, North Carolina
Year of birth missing (living people)
Living people
21st-century American politicians
People from Youngsville, North Carolina